Edwin David Watson II (born September 29, 1976) is a former American football running back in the National Football League (NFL) who played for the Philadelphia Eagles. He played college football for the Purdue Boilermakers. He also played in NFL Europe for the Berlin Thunder.

References

1976 births
Living people
American football running backs
Philadelphia Eagles players
Berlin Thunder players
Purdue Boilermakers football players